Summer Vibes is the second extended play by South Korean boy band Astro. It was released by Fantagio Music on July 1, 2016, and distributed by Interpark. The EP contains 6 tracks including the lead single "Breathless".

Background and release
In June 2016, Fantagio Music reveals details for the second EP by rookie boy-group, Astro. The EP is called Summer Vibes, with the lead single titled "Breathless". It was also revealed that Astro collaborated with the same composers who produced the tracks for their debut album.

"Breathless" is a refreshing song with a clear and addictive melody. It is also described as a breezy, synth-pop track that continues the feel-good vibes from their debut single "Hide & Seek".

The music video for "Breathless" was also released on July 1, featuring I.O.I member and label-mate, Choi Yoo-jung. The first half of the music video is filmed in Jeongdongjin Beach Park, while the second half is filmed in a forest in Namyangju. It shows the boys enjoying summer activities, as they appear to be human incarnations of soda bottles of the lead star.

Track listing

Charts

Weekly

Monthly

Year-end

Sales and certifications

Release history

References

2016 EPs
Astro (South Korean band) albums
Korean-language EPs
Interpark Music EPs